Detour Island is an island lying  west of False Cape Renard, on the west side of Lemaire Channel in the Wilhelm Archipelago. It was first charted by the French Antarctic Expedition, 1903–05, under Jean-Baptiste Charcot, and was so named by the UK Antarctic Place-Names Committee in 1959 because the island lies near the entrance to the ships' passage west of Booth Island which provides an alternative route to Lemaire Channel when the latter is blocked by ice.

See also 
 List of Antarctic and sub-Antarctic islands

References 

Islands of the Wilhelm Archipelago